Fustius extuta is a moth of the family Erebidae first described by Michael Fibiger in 2010. It is known from northern Thailand.

The wingspan is about 11 mm. The head, patagia, anterior part of the tegulae, prothorax, the basal part of the costa, the triangular patch of the medial area and the terminal area, including the fringes are black. The forewing ground colour is beige, suffused with light brown scales. The crosslines are untraceable and the terminal line is marked by black interneural dots. The hindwing is beige, with a narrow brown terminal line and an indistinct discal spot. The fringes are white basally, otherwise beige. The underside of the forewing is grey brown, while the underside of the hindwing is grey, with an indistinct discal spot.

References

Micronoctuini
Moths described in 2010
Taxa named by Michael Fibiger